Adam Watson, FRSE, FRSB, FINA, FRMS, FCEH (14 April 1930 – 23 January 2019) was a Scottish biologist, ecologist and mountaineer. He was one of the most recognisable scientific figures in Scotland due to his many appearances on TV and radio. His large academic output and contributions to the understanding of the flora and fauna in Scotland and elsewhere have been internationally recognised. Dr Watson was widely acknowledged as Scotland's pre-eminent authority on the Cairngorms mountain range.

Early and personal life 
Adam Watson was born on 14 April 1930 at Turriff, Aberdeenshire, Scotland. In March 1955 he married Jenny Raitt, with whom he had two children, Jenny and Adam Christopher.

Academic achievements 
From an early age, Watson showed considerable academic prowess. He was Dux of Turriff Primary School (1942) and of Turriff Senior Secondary School (1948) in Latin, English, Higher Latin, English, French, Science, lower History and Mathematics.

At Aberdeen University, in 1952 Watson gained 1st class honours in Pure Science (Zoology) and also won the MacGillivray Prize, Department of Natural History. In 1956, he got a PhD for his thesis on the "Annual Cycle of Rock Ptarmigan", a bird that has fascinated Watson all of his adult life. In 1967, he added a 2nd Doctorate (DSc) for scientific papers on populations and behaviour of northern animals.

Watson was inspired by the writings of Seton Gordon, whose book The Cairngorm Hills of Scotland Watson came across as a child, and was 'transformed' by its content. This sparked his lifelong interest in the Cairngorms, and Watson remained in contact with Gordon until his death in 1977.

Published work and editorships 
The body of work by Watson over 58 years (1944–2012) includes 23 books, 287 peer-reviewed scientific papers, 178 technical reports, 40 book reviews, and many articles in newspapers and magazines.

His editorships include:
 1956–64 Editor, The Scottish Naturalist
 1969 editorial board, Journal of Animal Ecology
 1970 Editor, British Ecological Society's 10th Symposium Volume, Animal Populations in relation to their Food Resources, Blackwell Scientific Publications
 1981–89 editorial board, Agriculture, Ecosystems & Environment

The Place Names of Upper Deeside 
The Place Names of Upper Deeside is a 1984 toponymic book by Watson and Elizabeth Allan about the Gaelic place names in the upper part of western Aberdeenshire known as Deeside.

Watson started his research in 1971 and collected over the next 13 years more than 7,000 place-names largely based on interviews with 260 local people. Interviewees included the last surviving native speaker of Deeside Gaelic, Jean Bain in Crathie, Aberdeenshire.

A contemporary review said about the book: "There have been many place name studies published in Scotland during the course of the present century but none can match in detail and usefulness The Place Names of Upper Deeside by Adam Watson and Elizabeth Allan." Professor of Celtic at the University of Glasgow Derick Thomson described the book's detail and breadth in The Year's Work in Modern Language Studies. A review in The Scots Magazine called it "a remarkable gazetteer of the topography running to 220 large pages in a beautifully-presented work". The Scotsman upon Watson's death in 2019, called the book "magisterial".

Watson continued his toponymic studies later in life, and published Place Names in Much of North-East Scotland about place names in Angus and Kincardineshire in 2013, and, with Ian Murray, the book Upper Deeside and the far Highlands in 2015.

Testimonials 
 "He brought to the (John Muir) Trust immense expertise and authority from a lifetime's scientific work on the ecology of the Cairngorms, an unparalleled field knowledge of the hills and intense personal commitment to their special qualities."
 "Few people know more about snow in Britain than Watson, who has spent almost six decades ski-mountaineering and walking around the Cairngorms, studying snow and the birds and mammals that live in it."
 "Dr. Watson was one of the most respected authorities within his field.  He has written fifteen books on landscape and wildlife, including the definitive mountaineering guide The Cairngorms, which has been in-print since the 1960s."

Fellowships, honours and awards 
 1969 Nuffield Fellowship to lecture at Canadian universities
 1971 Fellow of the Royal Society of Edinburgh
 1980 Fellow of the Institute of Biology
 1980 Chartered Biologist of the Institute of Biology
 1982 Honorary Life Member, Cairngorm Club
 1983 Fellow of the Arctic Institute of North America
 1986 Royal Society of Edinburgh Neill Prize for 'your outstanding contribution to Natural History and in particular to your study of Red Grouse and the environmental impacts of developments in mountainous countryside’
 1986 Distinguished Scholar at University of Virginia
 1995 DUniv, University of Stirling (Honorary)
 1995 Medal of the Royal Society for the Protection of Birds
 1995 Witherby Lecturer, British Trust for Ornithology
 1997 Honorary Life Member Worldwide Fund for Nature-UK "in recognition of..outstanding quality of work, and a lifetime of dedication to securing the future of the Cairngorms", also Honorary Life Member of the Scottish Ornithologists Club
 2000 Emeritus Fellow of the Centre for Ecology and Hydrology
 2003 Portrait for permanent display in the Scottish National Portrait Gallery
 2004 Lifetime Achievement Award of the John Muir Trust, for conserving wild places – presented by Dick Balharry
 2006 Associate Fellow of Royal Meteorological Society
 2008 Emeritus Member of the Ecological Society of America
 2009 Fellow of the Royal Meteorological Society
 2012 Award for Excellence in Mountain Culture, Fort William Festival
 2012 Golden Eagle Award of the Outdoor Writers and Photographers Guild
 2014 DSc, Aberdeen (Honorary)

Watson was also an Emeritus member of the Ecological Society of America, and had been a member of the Scottish Mountaineering Club since 1954.

Notable duties 
 1972 Chief expert witness for the Crown in the Cairngorm Plateau Disaster Fatal Accident Inquiry in February at Banff (five children from Ainslie Park High School, Edinburgh, and an instructor died in the snow at Feith Buidhe on the plateau in November 1971)
 1981 Main scientific witness commissioned by the Nature Conservancy Council at the Lurcher's Gully Public Inquiry, on behalf of the Institute of Terrestrial Ecology
 1984 One of the first Trustees of the John Muir Trust, Trustee 1984–97, Honorary Adviser 1997–2003
 1990–92 Commissioner, Countryside Commission for Scotland
 1995–97 board member, Cairngorms Partnership
 Independent monitoring scientist for downhill ski areas at the Lecht (1984 to date), Glenshee (1986 to date), Cairn Gorm (1990–99), Glencoe (1996), and gave technical advice to Nevis Range in November 1995.
 Author, Environmental Baseline Study for Glenshee Ski Centre (1987), Environmental Baseline Study of Damaged Ground at Cairngorm Estate (1994), and nine Environmental Statements on proposed ski developments at Lecht (3), Cairn Gorm (2), Glenshee (2) and Glencoe (2).

Later years 

Watson was fascinated by snow since childhood and published widely on the longevity of snow-patches on Scotland's mountains. In May 2009 he led a walk at Glenshee on which he showed the participants the long-lying snow-patches of the Cairngorms and the effects of snow-lie on vegetation.

Bibliography 
 1963. Mountain hares. Sunday Times Publications, London. (AW & R. Hewson)
 1970. Animal populations in relation to their food resources (Editor). Blackwell Scientific Publications, Oxford and Edinburgh.
 1970. Adam Watson & Gordon R Miller, Grouse Management (Game Conservancy, Fordingbridge, and 1976 new edition)
 1974. Desmond Nethersole-Thompson & Adam Watson, The Cairngorms: their Natural History and Scenery (Collins, London, 1981 new edition Melven Press, Perth)
 1975. Adam Watson, The Cairngorms, Scottish Mountaineering Club District Guide (also 1992 and later editions)
 1982. Robert Moss, Adam Watson & John G. Ollason, Animal Population Dynamics (Chapman & Hall, London)
 1982. Kai Curry-Lindahl, Adam Watson & R, Drennan Watson, The Future of the Cairngorms (North East Mountain Trust, Aberdeen)
 1984. Adam Watson & Elizabeth Allan, The Place Names of Upper Deeside (Aberdeen University Press)
 1998. Stuart Rae & Adam Watson, The Cairngorms of Scotland (Eagle Crag, Aberdeen)
 2008. Adam Watson & Robert Moss, Grouse. HarperCollins, Collins New Naturalist Library No 107, hardback and paperback
 2010. Cool Britannia: snowier times in 1580–1930 than since. Paragon Publishing, Rothersthorpe (by AW & I. Cameron)
 2011. It's a fine day for the hill. Paragon Publishing, Rothersthorpe
 2011. A zoologist on Baffin Island, 1953. Paragon Publishing, Rothersthorpe
 2011. Vehicle hill tracks in northern Scotland. The North East Mountain Trust, Aberdeen, published imprint Paragon Publishing, Rothersthorpe
 2011. A snow book, northern Scotland: based on the author's field observations in 1938–2011. Paragon Publishing, Rothersthorpe
 2012. Some days from a hill diary: Scotland, Iceland, Norway, 1943–50. Paragon Publishing, Rothersthorpe
 2012. Human impacts on the northern Cairngorms: A. Watson's scientific evidence for the 1981 Lurcher's Gully Public Inquiry into proposed Cairn Gorm ski developments, and associated papers on people and wildlife. Paragon Publishing, Rothersthorpe
 2012. Birds in north-east Scotland then and now: field observations mainly in the 1940s and comparison with recent records. Paragon Publishing, Rothersthorpe (by AW & Ian Francis)
 2013. Place names in much of north-east Scotland. Hill, glen, lowland, coast, sea, folk. Paragon Publishing, Rothersthorpe
 2013. Points, sets and man. Pointers and setters, stars of research on grouse, ptarmigan and other game. Paragon Publishing, Rothersthorpe
 2013. Hill birds in north-east Highlands. Field observations over decades – ptarmigan, red grouse, golden plover, dotterel, bird counts. Paragon Publishing, Rothersthorpe
 2013. Mammals in north-east Highlands – red deer, mountain hares, others. Paragon Publishing, Rothersthorpe
 2014. More days from a hill diary: Scotland, Norway, Newfoundland, 1951–80. Paragon Publishing, Rothersthorpe
 2014. Plants in north-east Highlands – timing of blaeberry growth, tree regeneration, land use, plant orientation. Paragon Publishing, Rothersthorpe
 2015. Place name discoveries on Upper Deeside and the far Highlands. Paragon Publishing, Rothersthorpe (by AW & Ian Murray)
 2016. Essays on lone trips, mountain-craft and other hill topics.  Paragon Publishing, Rothersthorpe
 2019. "Observations of Golden Eagles in Scotland: A Historical & Ecological Review". Hancock House Publishers, Surrey, BC, Canada.

References

Sources for The Place Names of Upper Deeside

Further reading

External links 
 Interview with Gordon Casely in Leopard Magazine.
 News of the lifetime achievement award given to Dr Watson by the John Muir trust.
 Highland Naturalists biography.
 National Galleries of Scotland portrait.
 Guardian article with Charlie English interviewing Dr Watson about snow.
 Radio 4's The Living World with Lionel Kelleway, where he and Dr Watson go in search of grouse.
 Current TV interview with Watson on Scotland's changing winter climate.
 Observations of Golden Eagles in Scotland Dr. Watson's last published work

1930 births
2019 deaths
Alumni of the University of Aberdeen
Fellows of the Royal Society of Edinburgh
Scottish biologists
Scottish mountain climbers
People from Formartine
Scottish ecologists
Fellows of the Royal Society of Biology